Datia District is in Gwalior Division in the Indian state of Madhya Pradesh. The town of Datia is its district headquarters.

History
It is an ancient town, mentioned in the Mahabharata. Sahadeva; one of the Pandava brothers had won this kingdom from King Dantavakra. Datia had formerly been a state in the Bundelkhand region. The ruling family were Rajputs of the Bundela clan; they descended from a younger son of a former raja of Orchha. The chief rulers of Datia were Bhagwan Rao, Shubhkaran Rao, Dalpat Rao and Ramchandra and they had good relations with the Mughals. There is a fort palace at Datia, the architecture of which is chiefly Indo-Islamic which partly inspired the chief architect Edward Lutyens, while designing New Delhi. The state was administered as part of the Bundelkhand agency of Central India. It lay in the extreme north-west of Bundelkhand, near Gwalior, and was surrounded on all sides by other princely states of Central India, except on the east where it bordered upon the United Provinces. It was second highest in the rank of all the Bundela states after Orchha, with a 15-gun salute, and its Maharajas bore the hereditary title of Second of the Princes of Bundelkhand. The land area of the state was 2130 km² and its population in 1901 was 173,759.

Datia, together with the rest of the Bundelkhand agency, became part of the new state of Vindhya Pradesh in 1950. In 1956, Vindhya Pradesh state was merged with certain other areas to form the state of Madhya Pradesh within the Union of India.

Geography
The district has an area of 2,691 km2, and a population 627,818 (2001 census). The population of Datia District increased by 26% from 1981 to 1991, and by 22% from 1991 to 2001. The district has 445 villages and 5 towns, Datia, Badoni,  Seondha, Bhander and Indergarh. Each town is the headquarters of its tehsil.

Datia is bounded by the Madhya Pradesh districts of Bhind to the north, Gwalior to the west, and Shivpuri to the south, and by Jhansi District of Uttar Pradesh state to the east. The district is part of Gwalior Division.

Demographics

According to the 2011 census Datia District has a population of 786,754 roughly equal to the nation of Comoros or the US state of South Dakota. This gives it a ranking of 487th in India (out of a total of 640). Its population growth rate over the decade 2001-2011 was 18.4%. Datia has a sex ratio of 873 females for every 1000 males, and a literacy rate of 72.63%. 23.13% of the population lives in urban areas. Scheduled Castes and Scheduled Tribes make up 25.46% and 1.91% of the population respectively.

Languages

At the time of the 2011 Census of India, 91.06% of the population in the district spoke Hindi and 8.16% Bundeli as their first language. Bundelkhandi is the main dialect of the district.

See also
Datia State

References

External links

 
Districts of Madhya Pradesh